George Wagner Hale (August 3, 1894 – November 1, 1945) was a professional baseball player. Nicknamed "Ducky", he was a catcher over parts of four seasons (1914, 1916–18) with the St. Louis Browns.  For his career, he compiled a .175 batting average in 103 at-bats, with nine runs batted in.

He was born in Dexter, Kansas and died in Wichita, Kansas at the age of 51.

External links

1894 births
1945 deaths
St. Louis Browns players
Major League Baseball catchers
Baseball players from Kansas
Birmingham Barons players
Rochester Hustlers players
Omaha Rourkes players
Omaha Buffaloes players
Oklahoma City Indians players
Terre Haute Tots players
Beaumont Exporters players
Kankakee Kanks players